The Time Is Right is an album by jazz saxophonist Lou Donaldson recorded for the Blue Note label and performed by Donaldson with trumpeter  Blue Mitchell, pianist Horace Parlan, bassist Laymon Jackson, drummer Dave Bailey, and congalero Ray Barretto with Sam Jones and Al Harewood replacing Jackson and Bailey on one track. The album was awarded 3 stars in an Allmusic review. It was released on CD only in Japan.

Track listing
 "Lou's Blues" (Donaldson) - 5:55
 "Be My Love" (Nicholas Brodszky, Sammy Cahn) - 5:45
 "Idaho" (Jesse Stone) - 5:10
 "The Nearness of You" (Hoagy Carmichael, Ned Washington) - 4:42
 "Mack the Knife" (Marc Blitzstein, Bertolt Brecht, Kurt Weill) - 5:17
 "Crosstown Shuffle" (Donaldson) - 5:15
 "Tangerine" - (Johnny Mercer, Victor Schertzinger) - 4:57

Recorded on October 31 (tracks 1, 2, 4-7) and November 28 (track 3), 1959.

Personnel
Tracks 1, 2, 4-7
Lou Donaldson - alto saxophone
Horace Parlan - piano
Blue Mitchell - trumpet - except track 2
Laymon Jackson - bass
Dave Bailey - drums
Ray Barretto - congas

Track 3
Lou Donaldson - alto saxophone
Horace Parlan - piano
Blue Mitchell - trumpet 
Sam Jones - bass
Al Harewood - drums

Production
 Alfred Lion - producer
 Reid Miles - design
 Rudy Van Gelder - engineer
 Francis Wolff - photography

References

Lou Donaldson albums
1960 albums
Blue Note Records albums
Albums produced by Alfred Lion
Albums recorded at Van Gelder Studio